Sébastien Mazure (born 20 March 1979, in Paris) is a French former professional footballer who played as a striker.

References

1979 births
Living people
Association football forwards
French footballers
Le Havre AC players
Stade Malherbe Caen players
AS Saint-Étienne players
Ligue 1 players
Ligue 2 players